The Ica stones are a collection of andesite stones found in Ica Province, Peru that bear a variety of diagrams. Some of them supposedly have depictions of dinosaurs, and what is alleged to be advanced technology. These are recognised as modern curiosities or hoaxes.

In the 1960s Javier Cabrera Darquea began to collect and popularize the stones, obtaining many of them from a farmer named Basilio Uschuya. Uschuya, after claiming them to be real ancient artifacts, admitted to creating the carvings he had sold and said he produced a patina by baking the stone in cow dung.

Description
The stones are composed of andesite. As a result of weathering, they have developed a thin patina. It consists of a weathering rind in which weathering has turned some of the feldspar into clay, resulting in a softer material, rated 3 to 4 on the Mohs scale of mineral hardness, which can be scratched.

They are shallowly engraved with a variety of images, some directly incised, others by removing the background, leaving the image in relief. The images vary from simple pictures on one side of a pebble, up to designs of great complexity. Some of the designs are in styles which can be recognized as belonging to the Paracas, Nazca, Tiwanaku, or Inca cultures.

Some of the images are of flowers, fish, or living animals of various sorts. Others appear to depict scenes which would be anachronistic in pre-Columbian art, such as knowledge of dinosaurs, advanced medical works and maps.

Background
Archaeological remains show evidence of Peruvian cultures going back for several thousand years. At some later stages, the whole of modern Peru was united into a single political and cultural unit, culminating in the Inca Empire, followed by the Spanish conquest. At other stages, areas such as the Ica Valley, a habitable region separated from others by desert, developed distinctive cultures of their own.

Excavations in Ica Province were carried out in the late nineteenth and early twentieth centuries by scholars such as Max Uhle, Julio C. Tello, Alfred L. Kroeber, William Duncan Strong and John Howland Rowe. None of them reported the discovery of carved andesite stones. Nevertheless, carved stones which had been looted by huaqueros, grave robbers, began to be offered for sale to tourists and amateur collectors.

One of these collectors was Santiago Agurto Calvo, an architect by profession, who was Rector of the National University of Engineering in Lima. He organised searches in ancient cemeteries, and in August 1966 found such a stone in the Toma Luz sector, Callango district, in Ica Valley. The context corresponded to the Tiwanaku culture. He reported his discovery to the Regional Museum in Ica city, and was accompanied on further expeditions by its curator, the archaeologist Alejandro Pezzia Assereto. In September 1966 in Uhle Hill cemetery, De la Banda sector, Ocucaje District, they found, for the first time, an engraved stone with certain provenance in a tomb of the Paracas culture. On it was carved a design which might be abstract, or could be taken as a flower with eight petals. Agurto published the discovery in a Lima newspaper.

Pezzia continued to search. In the San Evaristo cemetery in Toma Luz, he found a carved stone of similar size to the previous one, with a realistic image of a fish. The context dated the tomb to the Middle Horizon (600-1000 A.D.). In a grave not far away in the same cemetery, he found a stone with the fairly realistic design of a llama, in a context typical of the Ica culture. In 1968, Pezzia published his findings, including drawings and descriptions.

Popularization by Cabrera

Meanwhile, in 1966, Peruvian physician Javier Cabrera Darquea was presented with a stone that had a carved picture of a fish, which Cabrera believed to be of an extinct species. Cabrera's father had begun a collection of similar stones in the 1930s, and based on his interest in Peruvian prehistory, Cabrera began collecting more. He initially purchased more than 300 stones from two brothers, Carlos and Pablo Soldi, who also collected pre-Incan artifacts, and claimed they had unsuccessfully attempted to interest archaeologists in them. Cabrera later found another source of the stones, a farmer named Basilio Uschuya, who sold him thousands more. Cabrera's collection burgeoned, reaching more than 11,000 stones in the 1970s.

Cabrera published a book, The Message of the Engraved Stones of Ica on the subject, discussing his theories of the origins and meaning of the stones. In this he argued that the stones were evidence "that man is at least 405 million years old" and for what he calls "gliptolithic" man, humans from another planet. He said that "Through the transplantation of cognitive codes to highly intelligent primates, the men from outer space created new men on earth." The Ica stones achieved greater popular interest when Cabrera abandoned his medical career and opened a museum to feature several thousand of the stones in 1996.

In 1973, during an interview with Erich von Däniken, Uschuya stated he had faked the stones that he had sold. In 1975 Uschuya and another farmer named Irma Gutierrez de Aparcana confirmed that they had forged the stones they gave to Cabrera by copying the images from comic books, text books and magazines. Later, Uschuya recanted the forging story during an interview with a German journalist, saying that he had claimed they were a hoax to avoid imprisonment for selling archaeological artifacts.

In 1977, during the BBC documentary Pathway to the Gods, Uschuya produced an Ica stone with a dentist's drill and claimed to have produced a fake patina by baking the stone in cow dung. That same year, another BBC documentary was released with a skeptical analysis of Cabrera's stones, and the new-found attention to the phenomenon prompted Peruvian authorities to arrest Uschuya, as Peruvian law prohibits the sale of archaeological discoveries. Uschuya recanted his claim that he had found them and instead admitted they were hoaxes, saying "Making these stones is easier than farming the land." He engraved the stones using images in books and magazines as examples and knives, chisels and a dental drill. He also said that he had not made all the stones. He was not punished, and continued to sell similar stones to tourists as trinkets. The stones continued to be made and carved by other artists as forgeries of the original forgeries.

Impact
Except in the rare cases that provenance is known, there is no reliable way of dating the stones. Thus, a stone of uncertain origin can never be used to establish a conclusion which would otherwise be considered unlikely. The stones have been used by some Young Earth creationists to claim that humans lived in proximity with dinosaurs, which contradicts evidence that the extinction of dinosaurs predates mankind by approximately 66 million years. At least one major Young-Earth creationist source has rejected their use as an argument for Young-Earth creationism. Believers in ancient astronauts have also attempted to use the stones as evidence of a lost, advanced civilization brought to man from other planets and mytho-historians have claimed them as evidence that ancient myths are accurate histories, neither of which is a position supported in the scientific or academic communities.

In his Encyclopedia of Dubious Archaeology: From Atlantis To The Walam Olum, archaeologist Ken Feder commented "The Ica Stones are not the most sophisticated of the archaeological hoaxes discussed in this book, but they certainly rank up there as the most preposterous."

See also
 Acámbaro figures
 Out-of-place artifact
 Rock art

Footnotes

External links

Images of the Ica stones
Theory post-Cabrera - articles on the Ica Stones, the Global Elite, the Pleiadians, etc.
Ica stones at the Pseudoarcheology Research Archive

20th-century hoaxes
Archaeological forgeries
Hoaxes in Peru
Peruvian art
Peruvian culture
Pseudoarchaeology
Pseudohistory